Technological University (Pathein) is situated at the Apin-ne-se village which is in Pathein District, the Ayeyawady Division, Myanmar. It was opened on 27 December 1999 as Government Technological Collage(G.T.C) and became Technological University (Pathein) on 20 January 2007. The university is run by Ministry of Education (Myanmar).

Departments 

 Department of Civil Engineering
 Department of Electronic Engineering
 Department of Electrical Power Engineering
 Department of Mechanical Engineering
 Department of Information Technology

Academic Departments 

 Department of Myanmar
 Department of Engineering Chemistry
 Department of English
 Department of Engineering Mathematics
 Department of Engineering Physics

Programs
 B.E Degree Courses for following engineering majors:
Civil Engineering
Electronics Engineering
Electrical Power Engineering
Mechanical Engineering
Information Technology

Degree Offer

Ranking
According to Universities Ranking of Myanmar  
by the collage wikipedia, Technological University (Pathein) was ranked 4th in Ayeyarwady Region and 38th nationally .

See also
Yangon Technological University
West Yangon Technological University
List of Technological Universities in Myanmar

References

External links 
Technological University(Pathein) Official Web Site
Myanmar Engineering Society

Ayeyarwady Region
Educational institutions established in 1999
Technological universities in Myanmar
1999 establishments in Myanmar